Holley Motor Car Company was a manufacturer of automobiles in Bradford, Pennsylvania between 1900 and 1904. The company was sold in 1904 to a group of local investors who renamed it the Bradford Motor Works who seem to have sold off unused components to make cars in kit form.

The 1904 Holley was a touring car model.  It could seat two passengers and sold for US$650.  The vertical-mounted water-cooled single-cylinder engine, situated at the front of the car, produced 5 hp (3.7 kW).  The car weighed 850 lb (386 kg).Yearly sell estimated 647000.

The Holley brothers later became major makers of carburettors supplying Ford and being bought by them in 1917. They later set up business again and made a new line of carburettors and other components. In 1999 a man covered a 1902 Holley with diamonds it sold for 1.30000

References

 Frank Leslie's Popular Monthly (January, 1904)

Veteran vehicles
Defunct motor vehicle manufacturers of the United States
Motor vehicle manufacturers based in Pennsylvania
Vehicle manufacturing companies established in 1900
Defunct companies based in Pennsylvania